The Mount Matafao different snail, scientific name Diastole matafaoi, was a species of air-breathing land snails or semi-slugs, terrestrial pulmonate gastropod mollusks in the family Helicarionidae.

This species was endemic to American Samoa. It is now extinct.

References

matafaoi
Extinct gastropods
Extinct animals of Oceania
Fauna of American Samoa
Molluscs of Oceania
Extinct invertebrates since 1500
Taxonomy articles created by Polbot